This is the videography of Got7, a K-pop boy group. Got7 has released a total of 33 music videos, four seasons of a YouTube reality series, and a web drama, Dream Knight, which gained 13 million views by its fourth episode. Additionally the group has been shown to have strong variety skills though their TV variety program I Got7.

Music videos

Dramas 

Produced by JYP Entertainment and Youku Tudou, Dream Knight is a fantasy romance web drama which premiered on 27 January 2015, and ran for 12 episodes until 5 March 2015. Each episode lasts around 12–15 minutes, with the final episode being 23 minutes in total. The series revolves around an orphaned, bullied high school girl, Joo In-hyeong, played by Song Ha-yoon, who suffers from a terminal illness. Her bleak, solitary life starts to look better when she is suddenly befriended by a group of mysterious boys, played by members of Got7, who provide her with happiness, love, support and friendship. Unbeknownst to In-hyeong, the four knights possess magical powers and are on a mission to protect and care for her, until an unexpected discovery threatens their loyalty. The drama features many famous faces, with Miss A's Min starring in a lead role, and cameos by comedian Lee Guk-joo, 2PM's Chansung, Park Ji-min (15&), as well as JYP Entertainment's founder Park Jin-young, and actor Choi Woo-shik. On September 15, Dream Knight was added onto Netflix with English, Korean, Chinese, and Spanish subtitles.

Web series and TV shows

Real Got7 and Got2DAY

Got7's company JYP Entertainment has produced four seasons of a reality YouTube series, Real Got7, that provides a different view of the members as they go about various activities. The episodes were uploaded onto the official JYP Entertainment YouTube Channel and include English subtitles. Each season consists of ten episodes that vary in length. In season 1, the first several episodes show the members getting ready for the group's debut with later episodes showing the members having fun together in various locations. Season 2 introduced a "secret angel" game, with each member randomly choosing another to take care of during the promotion period for Got7's song "A". Most of the second season's episodes were focused on the members' behind the scenes actions at events such as fan-signs, music programs, and photo shoots.

Due to the group attending numerous overseas activities, season 3 was shot with at least one extended break between episodes 5 and 6. Season 3 was later made available to purchase on DVD. The DVD set came with bonus material, including previously unreleased footage, 3 making-of videos, and 21 episodes of Got2DAY, a series that had each member participate in an open talk with each of the other members. A second series of Got2DAY was released in Autumn 2016 on Naver V Live, and later on Got7's official YouTube channel. The Got2DAY concept returned in late 2017, but, instead of being pre-recorded, were live broadcasts through the Naver V Live application. On September 15, all three seasons of Real Got7 were added onto Netflix with English, Korean, Chinese, and Spanish subtitles.

Real Got7 returned for a fourth series in Spring 2017, following a similar format and pattern to the previous three seasons. The ten episodes, each approximately around 20 minutes, were uploaded on Got7's official YouTube channel and Naver V Live. In 2019, Got2DAY 2019 debuted on YouTube and V Live.

Got7ing
In March 2016, the group began a new reality series called Got7ing, which was distributed through Naver's V-live phone app; unlike the majority of other content on the app, the episodes were each pre-filmed and edited. The episodes were also made available on the application's online site, and were later uploaded onto Got7's official YouTube channel.

A later version of this series, Got7ing+, has also been produced and is available to subscribers of the official Got7 CH+ channel on Naver V Live.

Got7's Hard Carry

In October 2016, Got7 began starring in their own reality television show, Got7's Hard Carry, hosted by Mnet. The series ran for ten weeks and was broadcast weekly on Mnet's television channel and through Naver V Live. As well as releasing teasers online before each episode, Mnet also shared unreleased clips following the broadcast, via the official M2 YouTube channel.

Prior to the series’ broadcast, Got7 live-streamed a launch show on Naver V Live where they outlined and explained their wishes for the Hard Carry series. Planned and produced by Got7 themselves, the show sees the seven members undertake a range of activities, including sports like skydiving, wakeboarding and fencing. To fit with Got7's international activities, the series was shot in various places, such as Canada, Thailand and Jeju Island. The members also self-produced music videos for several of their own songs, exclusively for the show.

The five-episode second season, Hard Carry 2, aired weekly on Wednesday evenings from September 26, 2018, to October 24, 2018. On October 23, 2019, a teaser for Hard Carry 2.5 was released; the three-episode season premiered on November 13, 2019, and ran for three weeks.

On February 3, 2020, the program won in the Entertainment Category of Vega Digital Awards with more than 100 million cumulative views.

IDOLity: Got7's TMI Lab

In late 2017, Mnet worked with Got7 again on a new three part series, IDOLity: Got7's TMI Lab, which aimed to discover more about the members through the completion of various strange tasks, for example, regarding athletic ability or tolerance towards spicy food.

Working Eat Holiday in Jeju

In February 2018, Got7 appeared in a new show, Working EAT Holiday in Jeju, which was broadcast through Naver V Live and a cable channel. The four-episode series aired on V Live from February 21, 2018, through March 21, 2018.

References

Videographies of South Korean artists
Got7